James Collins (1872–1900) was a Scottish footballer who played in the Football League for Newcastle United and Nottingham Forest.

References

1872 births
1900 deaths
Scottish footballers
English Football League players
Association football forwards
Newcastle East End F.C. players
Newcastle West End F.C. players
Newcastle United F.C. players
Nottingham Forest F.C. players
Sheppey United F.C. players
Chatham Town F.C. players